The Academy of Canadian Cinema & Television's 15th Gemini Awards were held on October 30, 2000, to honour achievements in Canadian television. The awards show, which was hosted by Steve Smith, took place at the John Bassett Theatre and was broadcast on CBC Television.

Awards

Best Dramatic Series
 Da Vinci’s Inquest - Haddock Entertainment, Barna-Alper Productions, Alliance Atlantis Productions, Canadian Broadcasting Corporation. Producers: Chris Haddock, Laszlo Barna, Lynn Barr, Tom Braidwood 
Drop the Beat - Back Alley Film Productions. Producers: Adrienne Mitchell, Christine Shipton, Janis Lundman
Stargate SG-1 - Stargate SG-1 Productions. Producers: John Smith, Robert C. Cooper, Michael Greenburg, Richard Dean Anderson, Brad Wright
The Outer Limits - Alliance Atlantis, Atlantis Films, Showtime Networks, Trilogy Entertainment. Producers: John Watson, Brent Karl Clackson, Pen Densham, Sam Egan, Richard Barton Lewis
Twice in a Lifetime - Pebblehut Productions, Paxson Entertainment, CTV Television Network. Producers - Michael Prupas, Stephen Brackley, Barney Rosenzweig, Marilyn Stonehouse, Michael J. Maschio

Best TV Movie or Dramatic Mini-series
Dr. Lucille: The Lucille Teasdale Story - TVA International/Motion International, Ballistic Pictures. Producers: Francine Allaire, Claude Bonin, Andre Picard
Restless Spirits - Accent Entertainment, Temple Street Productions. Producers: Sheila Hockin, Patrick Whitley, Susan Cavan
Murder Most Likely - Alliance Atlantis, CTV Television Network, Judas Kiss Productions, Two Bridges Entertainment, Telefilm Canada. Producers: Frank Siracusa, Anne Marie La Traverse, Paul Gross, R.B.Carney, Robert Forsyth
One Heart Broken Into Song - Picture Plant, Canadian Broadcasting Corporation. Producers: William D. MacGillivray, Terry Greenlaw
The Sheldon Kennedy Story - Alberta Filmworks, Sarrazin Couture Entertainment. Producers: Pierre Sarrazin, Doug MacLeod

Best Short Dramatic Program
A Feeling Called Glory - Cracked Pot Films. Producer: Coreen Mayrs
My Father’s Hands - Hungry Eyes Media. Producer: Jennifer Holness
The Daily Blade - Jigsaw Productions. Producer: David Coole

Best Comedy Program or Series
This Hour Has 22 Minutes - Salter Street Films, Canadian Broadcasting Corporation. Producers: Michael Donovan, Geoff D’Eon, Mark Farrell, Ginny Jones-Duzak, Jack Kellum
 Dave Broadfoot: Old Dog, New Tricks - Abbott-Ferguson Productions. Producers: Dave Broadfoot, Don Ferguson
Double Exposure - CBC Radio One. Producers: Bob Robertson, Linda Cullen, Nick Orchard
Made in Canada - Salter Street Films, Island Edge. Producers: Gerald Lunz, Michael Donovan
 Air Farce Live - Canadian Broadcasting Corporation. Producers: Roger Abbott, Don Ferguson
Bob and Margaret - Nelvana. Producers: David Fine, Michael Hirsh, Patrick Loubert, Alison Snowden, Clive A. Smith

Best Music, Variety Program or Series
East Coast Music Awards 2000 - (East Coast Music Association, CBC Halifax). Producers: Geoff D’Eon, Jac Gautreau, Michael Lewis
A George Fox Christmas - Alberta Filmworks. Producers: Tinti Moffat, Randy Bradshaw, Tony Baylis
Double Exposure - Another Swift Kick in the Year End - CBC Radio One. Producers: Bob Robertson, Linda Cullen, Nick Orchard
Intimate and Interactive - MuchMusic. Producer: Sheila Sullivan
 YAA! The YTV Achievement Awards - The 10th Anniversary - YTV. Producer: Joanne P. Jackson

Best Performing Arts Program or Series, or Arts Documentary Program or Series

Life and Times - Tall Tales From The Long Corner: The Life and Times of Ronnie Hawkins - 90th Parallel Productions, Canadian Broadcasting Corporation. Producer: Gordon Henderson

Donald Brittain Award for Best Social/Political Documentary Program
Deep Inside Clint Star - National Film Board of Canada. Producer: Silva Basmajian 
Asylum: Falling Through the Cracks - Canadian Broadcasting Corporation. Producer: Christopher Sumpton
Kikkik - Women's Television Network. Producer: Ole Gjerstad 
Legacy of Terror: The Bombing of Air India - Bishari Films, TVOntario. Producers: Shelley Saywell, Rudy Buttignol
The View from Here - The Holier It Gets - Mercury Films, Requisite Films, TVOntario. Producers: Nicholas de Pencier, Jennifer Baichwal, Rudy Buttignol

Best Documentary Series
The View from Here - TVOntario. Producer: Rudy Buttignol
Urban Angels of Medicine - Infinite Monkeys Productions, Microtainment Plus International. Producers: Lon Appleby, Garry Blye, Howard Berstein, Mark Shekter
SexTV - Citytv. Producers: Brad Brough, Moses Znaimer, Marcia Martin
The Sexual Century - Barna-Alper Productions. Producers: Laszlo Barna, Sally Doganis
 Witness - Canadian Broadcasting Corporation. Producers: Charlotte Odele, Marie Natanson, Hilary Armstrong

Best History/Biography Documentary Program
Sunrise Over Tiananmen Square - National Film Board of Canada. Producers: Donald McWilliams, Barrie Angus McLean
Life and Times - Ambition: The Life & Times of Ted Rogers - 90th Parallel Productions, Canadian Broadcasting Corporation. Producer: Gordon Henderson
The Man Who Might Have Been - An Inquiry Into the Life and Death of Herbert Norman - National Film Board of Canada. Producer: Gerry Flahive
The Viking Saga: The Era of the Long Ships - Galafilm, Agaton Film & TV. Producers: Arnie Gelbart, Bo G. Ericson, Lars Rengfelt
Unwanted Soldiers – National Film Board of Canada. Producer: Karen King

Best Science, Technology, Nature, Environment or Adventure Documentary Program
After Darwin - Galafilm, PTV Productions. Producer: Arnie Gelbart 
Edge of Extinction: Saving the Leatherback Sea Turtle - Breakthrough Entertainment. Producers: Stuart Goodman, Andrea Boyd, Peter Williamson, Ira Levy
Tatshenshini-Alsek Park: Heart of the Wilderness - Good Earth Productions, Bonterra Productions. Producers: Ihor Macijiwsky, Mitchell Azaria
The Nature of Things - Parkinson's: Lynda's Story - Canadian Broadcasting Corporation. Producer: David Tucker
The Secret World of Gardens - Bullfrog Films. Producer: Susan Fleming

Best News Information Series
the fifth estate - Canadian Broadcasting Corporation. Producers: David Studer, Susan Teskey
CounterSpin - CBC Newsworld. Producers: Tom Jokinen, Paul Jay, Ron Haggart
 Marketplace - Canadian Broadcasting Corporation. Producers: Leslie Peck, Julie Bristow
 Undercurrents - Canadian Broadcasting Corporation. Producers: Pam Bertrand, F.N. Morrison
Venture - Canadian Broadcasting Corporation. Producers: Sophia Hadzipetros, Marie Clarke

Best Newscast/News Special
The National/CBC News - Canadian Broadcasting Corporation. Producers: Kelly Crichton, Nigel Gibson, Fred Parker
24 Hours: Pan Am Games Producer: Cecil Rosner
CTV National News - Egyptair Flight 9-90 CTV Television Network. Producers: Henry Kowalski, Robert Hurst
Newswatch - Live from La Place du 6 decembre - Producer: Tony Ross
Sunday Report - Canadian Broadcasting Corporation. Producer: Hedy Korbee

Best Talk/General Information Series
Skylight - VisionTV. Producer: Rita Deverell
Bynon - PrimeTV. Producer: Arlene Bynon 
Hot Type - CBC Newsworld. Producers: Evan Solomon, Andrew Johnson
Imprint - CBC Newsworld. Producers: Linda Dunlop, Richard Ouzounian
Men on Women - Producer: Heather Ryall

Best Lifestyle Series
Foodessence - Salter Street Films. Producer: Charles Bishop 
Loving Spoonfuls - Indivisual Productions. Producer: Allan Novak
Moving On - Canadian Broadcasting Corporation, TVOntario. Producer: Doug Caldwell
Savoir Faire Specials - Primevista Television. Producer: Michael Prini
shiftTV - Shift Magazine. Producer: Andrew Heintzman, Cathie James

Best Animated Program or Series or Short Animated Program
Angela Anaconda - Decode Entertainment/C.O.R.E. Digital Pictures. Producers: Steven DeNure, Neil Court, Joanna Ferrone, John Mariella, Sue Rose, Beth Stevenson 
Beast Machines: Transformers - Mark Ralston, Ian Pearson, Asaph Fipke
Franklin - Nelvana. Producers: Clive A. Smith, Michael Hirsh, Patrick Loubert
Rolie Polie Olie- Nelvana, Métal Hurlant Productions. Producers: Clive A. Smith, Michael Hirsh, Patrick Loubert, William Joyce, Fabrice Giger
Something From Nothing - Portfolio Entertainment, Funbag Animation Studios, Noreen Young Productions. Producers: Lisa Olfman, Rick Morrison, Curtis Crawford

Best Preschool Program or Series
Polka Dot Shorts - TVOntario. Producer: Jed MacKay
 Panda Bear Daycare - YTV, Radical Sheep Productions. Producers: John Leitch, Rob Mills
Polkaroo's Number Wonders - TVOntario. Producer: Marie McCann
Ruffus the Dog - YTV, Radical Sheep Productions. Producers: John Leitch, Rob Mills
Scoop and Doozie - Queen Bee Productions. Producer: Romney Grant

Best Children’s or Youth Program or Series
Incredible Story Studios - Mind's Eye Entertainment, Vérité Films. Producers: Kevin DeWalt, Robert de Lint, Rob King, Virginia Thompson
Popular Mechanics For Kids - SDA Productions. Producers: Michael C. Lavoie, Jonathan Finkelstein, André A. Bélanger
Street Cents - Canadian Broadcasting Corporation. Producer: Barbara Kennedy
The Worst Witch - United Productions. Producers: Angela Beeching, Michael Haggiag, Dan Maddicott, Arnie Gelbart
 Yaa! To the M@X - YTV. Producers: Michel C. Lavoie, Jonathan Finkelstein, André A. Bélanger

Best Sports Program or Series
Legends of Hockey - Network Entertainment. Producers: Derik Murray, John Hamilton 
Crossing the White Line - Producers: Jack Rabinovitch, Simcha Jacobovici, Elliott Halpern
Dying to Win - Paradigm Pictures. Producers: Marrin Canell, Ted Remerowski
Lady of the Lake - Producers: Frank Savoie, Alan Mendelsohn, Laszlo Barna
Sports Journal - CBC Sports. Terry Walker, Claude Panet-Raymond, Tom Harrington, Ken Dodd

Best Live Sporting Event
Pan Am Games - CBC Sports. Producers: Joel Darling, Mike Brannagan
Air Canada Championship Producers: Greg Breakell, Deb Sanderson, Jeffrey Mather
TSN Blue Jays Baseball - TSN. Producers: Bruce Perrin, Rick Briggs-Jude

Best Live Special Event Coverage 
2000 Today - CBC Newsworld. Producers: Mark Bulgutch, Pam McNair, Chris Waddell
Canada AM - CTV Television Network. Producers: Michael Serapio, Zev Shalev
 @discovery.ca - Live From Mars - Discovery Channel. Producers: Alex Bystram, Deanna Kraus, Craig Colby, Penny Park, Jane Mingay
Manitoba Votes 1999 - CBC Manitoba. Producer: Cecil Rosner
Much@Woodstock '99 - Much Television. Producers: David Kines, Denise Donlon

Best Direction in a Dramatic Program or Mini-series
David Wellington - Restless Spirits (Accent Entertainment/Temple Street Productions)
Coreen Mayrs - A Feeling Called Glory (Cracked Pot Films)
George Mihalka - Dr. Lucille: The Lucille Teasdale Story (TVA International/Motion International/Ballistic Pictures)
Brad Turner - Must Be Santa (CBC)
Norma Bailey - The Sheldon Kennedy Story (Alberta Filmworks/Sarrazin Couture Entertainment)

Best Direction in a Dramatic Series
Ken Finkleman - Foolish Heart - The Critic (CBC)
Giles Walker - Cold Squad (Keatley MacLeod Productions/Atlantis Films)
Fred Frame - Mentors (Mind's Eye Entertainment/Anaid Productions)
Albert Kish - Power Play (CTV Originals/NDG Productions/Serendipity Point Films/Alliance Atlantis)
 Jerry Ciccoritti - The City Sarrazin Couture Entertainment)

Best Direction in an Information Program or Series
Neil Docherty - the fifth estate - Legacy of Pain (CBC)
Douglas Spencer - Off the Map (DBS-Gorica Productions)
Marian MacNair, Serge Marcil, Sid Goldberg, Jean Louis Côté - Popular Mechanics For Kids (SDA Productions)
Oleh Rumak, Claude Vickery, Jennifer Campbell - the fifth estate (CBC)
Randy Werle - Undercurrents (CBC)

Best Direction in a Documentary Program
Lesley Ann Patten - The Voice Set Free (Tightwire Productions)
Beverly Shaffer - Just a Wedding (NFB)
Shelley Saywell - Legacy of Terror: The Bombing of Air India (Bishari Films/TVOntario)
Lewis Cohen - Road Stories for the Flesh Eating Future (Galafilm)
Shui-Bo Wang - Sunrise Over Tiananmen Square (NFB)

Best Direction in a Documentary Series
Jennifer Baichwal - The View from Here - The Holier It Gets (Mercury Films/Requisite Films/TVOntario)
Peter von Puttkamer - Champions of the Wild - Bald Eagles (Omnifilm Entertainment/NFB) 
Leslie Côté - Forbidden Places (MapleRock Entertainment)
Samantha Linton - The Sex Files (Exploration Production)

Best Direction in a Comedy Program or Series
Henry Sarwer-Foner - Made in Canada - Damacles Directs (Salter Street Films/Island Edge)
Craig Pryce - I Was a Sixth Grade Alien (Winklemania Productions/AAC Kids)
Mike Clattenburg, Michael Lewis - The Bette Show (Salter Street Films)
Henry Sarwer-Foner - This Hour Has 22 Minutes (Salter Street Films, CBC)
Bruce McDonald - Twitch City (Shadow Shows/Accent Entertainment/Canadian Broadcasting Corporation)

Best Direction in a Variety, or Performing Arts Program or Series
Shelagh O'Brien - YAA! The YTV Achievement Awards - The 10th Anniversary - (YTV)
René Dowhaniuk - 14th Gemini Awards (Academy of Canadian Cinema & Television)
Mike Downie - Blue Rodeo: The Scenes in Between (Canadian Broadcasting Corporation|CBC)
Raymond Saint-Jean - The Child of Music (Cine Qua Non Films)
Larry Bauman - They Live to Polka (NFB)

Best Writing in a Dramatic Program or Mini-series
Rob Forsyth - Dr. Lucille: The Lucille Teasdale Story (TVA International/Motion International/Ballistic Pictures)
Coreen Mayrs - A Feeling Called Glory (Cracked Pot Films)
Semi Chellas, Gail Collins - Restless Spirits (Accent Entertainment/Temple Street Productions)
Jeremy Hole - External Affairs (Shaftesbury Films/Alliance Atlantis)
George Elliott Clarke - One Heart Broken Into Song (Picture Plant/CBC)

Best Writing in a Dramatic Series
Julie Lacey - Power Play - Foolish Hearts (CTV Originals/NDG Productions/Serendipity Point Films/Alliance Atlantis)
David Sutherland - Drop the Beat (Back Alley Film Productions)
Sam Egan - The Outer Limits (Alliance Atlantis/Atlantis Films/Showtime Networks/Trilogy Entertainment)
Peter Mitchell, Graham Clegg - Traders (Atlantis Films)

Best Writing in a Comedy or Variety Program or Series
Cathy Jones, Luciano Casimiri, Mark Farrell, Chris Finn, Edward Kay, Rick Mercer, Christian Murray, Tim Steeves, Greg Thomey, Mary Walsh, George Westerholm - This Hour Has 22 Minutes (Salter Street Films, CBC)
Bob Robertson, Linda Cullen - Double Exposure (CBC Radio One)
Mark Farrell, Edward Riche - Made in Canada (Salter Street Films, Island Edge)
Steve Smith, Bob Bainborough, Shaun Graham, Bruce Pirrie, Richard McDonald, Jeff Lumby - The Red Green Show (Red Green Productions)

Best Writing in an Information Program or Series
Francine Pelletier - the fifth estate - Legacy of Pain (CBC)
Donna Gabriel - Foodessence (Salter Street Films)
Matt Cowan - Undercurrents (CBC)
Tracie Tighe, David Gray - Venture (CBC)

Best Writing in a Documentary Program or Series
Jennifer Baichwal - The View from Here - The Holier It Gets (Mercury Films/Requisite Films/TVOntario)
Bill Cameron, Robin Benger - Asylum: Falling Through the Cracks (CBC) 
Shelley Saywell - Legacy of Terror: The Bombing of Air India (Bishari Films, TVOntario)
Shelley Saywell - Out of the Fire (Bishari Films)
Jerry Thompson - Stopping Traffik: The War Against the War on Drugs

Best Writing in a Children’s or Youth Program
Vicki Grant - Scoop and Doozie - What Rubbish! (Queen Bee Productions)
John van Bruggen - Franklin (Nelvana) 
Rob Mills - Ruffus the Dog (YTV/Radical Sheep Productions)
Phoebe Gilman, Christel Kleitsch, Avrum Jacobson - Something From Nothing (Portfolio Entertainment/Funbag Animation Studios/Noreen Young Productions)
Heather Conkie - The Artists' Specials - Degas and the Dancer (Devine Entertainment)

Best Performance by an Actor in a Leading Role in a Dramatic Program or Mini-series
Jonathan Scarfe - The Sheldon Kennedy Story (Alberta Filmworks/Sarrazin Couture Entertainment)
Victor Garber - External Affairs (Shaftesbury Films/Alliance Atlantis)
Paul Gross - Murder Most Likely (Alliance Atlantis/CTV/Judas Kiss Productions/Two Bridges Entertainment/Telefilm Canada)
Rainbow Sun Francks - One Heart Broken Into Song (Picture Plant/CBC)
Brent Carver - The Legend of Sleepy Hollow (Muse Entertainment/Hallmark Entertainment)

Best Performance by an Actress in a Leading Role in a Dramatic Program or Mini-series
Colleen Rennison - A Feeling Called Glory (Cracked Pot Films)
Megan Follows - Anne of Green Gables: The Continuing Story (Sullivan Entertainment)
Marina Orsini - Dr. Lucille: The Lucille Teasdale Story (TVA International/Motion International/Ballistic Pictures)
Deanna Milligan - Must Be Santa (CBC)
Polly Shannon - The Sheldon Kennedy Story (Alberta Filmworks/Sarrazin Couture Entertainment)

Best Performance by an Actor in a Continuing Leading Dramatic Role
Michael Riley - Power Play - What It All Meant (CTV Originals/NDG Productions/Serendipity Point Films/Alliance Atlantis)
Nicholas Campbell - Da Vinci's Inquest (Haddock Entertainment/Barna-Alper Productions/Alliance Atlantis Productions/Canadian Broadcasting Corporation) 
Ian Tracey - Da Vinci's Inquest (Haddock Entertainment/Barna-Alper Productions/Alliance Atlantis Productions/Canadian Broadcasting Corporation)
Donnelly Rhodes - Da Vinci's Inquest (Haddock Entertainment/Barna-Alper Productions/Alliance Atlantis Productions/Canadian Broadcasting Corporation)
Ted Atherton - Nothing Too Good for a Cowboy (Alliance Communications/Milestone Productions)

Best Performance by an Actress in a Continuing Leading Dramatic Role
Torri Higginson - The City - Properties of Light (Sarrazin Couture Entertainment) 
Julie Stewart - Cold Squad (Keatley MacLeod Productions/Atlantis Films)
Caroline Néron - Cover Me (Alliance Atlantis/Power Pictures/Serendipity Point Films)
Sarah Chalke - Nothing Too Good for a Cowboy (Alliance Communications/Milestone Productions)
Kari Matchett - Power Play (CTV Originals/NDG Productions/Serendipity Point Films/Alliance Atlantis)
Sonja Smits - Traders (Atlantis Films)

Best Performance by an Actor in a Guest Role Dramatic Series
Geordie Johnson - The City - Bed Fellows (Sarrazin Couture Entertainment) 
John Cassini - Da Vinci's Inquest - The Lottery (Haddock Entertainment/Barna-Alper Productions/Alliance Atlantis Productions/Canadian Broadcasting Corporation)
Matt Frewer - Da Vinci's Inquest - Fantasy (Haddock Entertainment/Barna-Alper Productions/Alliance Atlantis Productions/Canadian Broadcasting Corporation) 
Jere Burns - Twice in a Lifetime - The Trouble with Harry (Pebblehut Productions/Paxson Entertainment/CTV)
Brent Carver - Twice in a Lifetime - The Trouble with Harry (Pebblehut Productions/Paxson Entertainment/CTV)

Best Performance by an Actress in a Guest Role Dramatic Series
Alisen Down - Cold Squad - Dead Beat Walking (Keatley MacLeod Productions/Atlantis Films)
Alisen Down - Da Vinci's Inquest Bang Like That (Haddock Entertainment/Barna-Alper Productions/Alliance Atlantis Productions/Canadian Broadcasting Corporation)
Janet-Laine Green - Traders (Atlantis Films)
Taylor Anne Reid - Da Vinci's Inquest (Haddock Entertainment/Barna-Alper Productions/Alliance Atlantis Productions/Canadian Broadcasting Corporation)
Sheila McCarthy - The City (Sarrazin Couture Entertainment)

Best Performance by an Actor in a Featured Supporting Role in a Dramatic Program or Mini-series
Robert Wisden - The Sheldon Kennedy Story (Alberta Filmworks/Sarrazin Couture Entertainment)
Kenneth Welsh - External Affairs (Shaftesbury Films/Alliance Atlantis)
Henry Czerny - External Affairs (Shaftesbury Films/Alliance Atlantis)
Ardon Bess - One Heart Broken Into Song (Picture Plant/CBC)
Noel Fisher - The Sheldon Kennedy Story (Alberta Filmworks/Sarrazin Couture Entertainment)

Best Performance by an Actress in a Featured Supporting Role in a Dramatic Program or Mini-series
Shirley Douglas - Shadow Lake (Shadow Lake Productions/Breakthrough Entertainment/Sound Venture Productions)
Marie-Josée Croze - Murder Most Likely (Alliance Atlantis/CTV/Judas Kiss Productions/Two Bridges Entertainment/Telefilm Canada)
Janine Theriault - Murder Most Likely (Alliance Atlantis/CTV/Judas Kiss Productions/Two Bridges Entertainment/Telefilm Canada)

Best Performance by an Actor in a Featured Supporting Role in a Dramatic Series
Pedro Salvin - Amazon - The Chosen (Alliance Atlantis
Duncan Fraser - Da Vinci's Inquest - The Hanged Man (Haddock Entertainment/Barna-Alper Productions/Alliance Atlantis Productions/Canadian Broadcasting Corporation) 
Jonathan Rannells - Power Play (CTV Originals/NDG Productions/Serendipity Point Films/Alliance Atlantis)

Best Performance by an Actress in a Featured Supporting Role in a Dramatic Series
Shannon Lawson - The City - Free Fall (Sarrazin Couture Entertainment) 
Jackie Burroughs - Cover Me (Alliance Atlantis/Power Pictures/Serendipity Point Films)
Anita La Selva - Earth: Final Conflict (Atlantis Films)
Rachael Crawford - Traders (Atlantis Films)
Angela Vinat - Traders (Atlantis Films)

Best Performance in a Comedy Program or Series
Cathy Jones, Rick Mercer, Greg Thomey, Mary Walsh - This Hour Has 22 Minutes (Salter Street Films, CBC)
Gavin Crawford - Comedy Now! - Uncensored (CTV)
 Dave Broadfoot - Dave Broadfoot: Old Dog, New Tricks (Abbott-Ferguson Productions) 
Harland Williams - Comedy Now! - Harland’s Hilarious Hour (CTV)
Patrick McKenna, Jerry Schaefer, Wayne Robson, Steve Smith, Peter Keleghan, Bob Bainborough, Jeff Lumby, Joel Harris, Graham Greene - The Red Green Show (Red Green Productions)

Best Performance or Host in a Variety Program or Series
Brigitte Gall - Brigitte Gall: Joan of Montréal (Leopard Films)
Rick Mercer - 14th Gemini Awards (Academy of Canadian Cinema & Television)
Clint Moffatt, Scott Moffatt, Dave Moffatt, Bob Moffatt - Juno Awards of 2000 (Canadian Academy of Recording Arts and Sciences)
Teresa Pavlinek, Sarah Lafleur, Matthew Sharp, Janet van de Graaf, Ron Pardo, Bob Bainborough, Patrick McKenna, Rick Green - History Bites (The History Channel)
David Hyde Pierce - Just for Laughs (Just for Laughs Comedy Festival)

Best Performance in a Performing Arts Program or Series
Juan Chioran - Dracula (TVOntario)
Ginette Reno - Governor General's Performing Arts Awards (CBC Radio/National Arts Centre/Canada Council of the Arts/Canadian Conference of the Arts/Department of Canadian Heritage)
Ron Hynes - Ron Hynes: The Irish Tour (Rink Rat Productions)

Best Performance in a Preschool Program or Series
Sheila McCarthy - Sesame Park - Little Miss Muffet (CBC) 
 Jayne Eastwood - Noddy (Catalyst Entertainment) 
Sean McCann - Noddy (Catalyst Entertainment) 
Rob Mills - Ruffus the Dog (YTV/Radical Sheep Productions)
James Rankin - Scoop and Doozie (Queen Bee Productions)
Pier Paquette - Sesame Park (CBC)

Best Performance in a Children’s or Youth Program or Series
Matt Frewer - Mentors - A Transient, Shining Trouble (Mind's Eye Entertainment, Anaid Productions)
Patty Sullivan - Kids' Canada - Let's Get Real: Life at School (CBC Kids)
Ellen Page - Pit Pony (Cochran Entertainment)
Michael Scholar Jr., Duane Hall, Kim D’Eon, Nikki Barnett, Andrew Bush - Street Cents Music - (CBC)
Thomas Jay Ryan - The Artists' Specials - Degas and the Dancer (Devine Entertainment)

Best News AnchorDiana Swain - Manitoba Votes 1999 (CBC Manitoba)
Gloria Macarenko - Broadcast One (CBC)
Lloyd Robertson - CTV National News - A Millennium Celebration/Budget 2000/A Royal Wedding
Lisa LaFlamme - CTV National News - Millenium Special/Federal Budget/Egyptair Flight 9-90
Peter Mansbridge - The National/CBC News - 2000 Today - Mystery to Mars/A Royal Wedding (CBC Newsworld)

Best ReportageDon Murray - The National/CBC News - Traumatized Kids/Canada Bound/Revenge Attacks (CBC Newsworld)
Avis Favaro - CTV National News - Medical Mistake
Alan Fryer - CTV National News - The Elian Gonzalez Mystique
Paul Workman - The National/CBC News - Ruined Economy/Street Orphans (CBC Newsworld)
Terry Milewski - The National/CBC News - Seattle Showdown Day 1 (CBC Newsworld)

Best Information SegmentJennifer Campbell, Erin Paul - the fifth estate - Too Bad to Be True (CBC)
 Christian Coté, Melanie Verhaeghe - 24 Hours: Sins of the Father (CBC)
 Jim MacQuarrie - CBC News: Country Canada 
 Nancy Durham - The Magazine/CBC Newsworld 
 Tom Clark, Robert Osborne, Wendy Trueman, Avis Favaro - W5 (CTV)

Best Host or Interviewer in a News or Talk/General Information Program or SeriesRobert Mason Lee - Mason Lee: On The Edge - Newspaper Wars/Mixed Bag #1/Spiritual Matters (Agincourt Productions/CTV)
Avi Lewis - CounterSpin (CBC Newsworld)
Evan Solomon - Hot Type (CBC Newsworld) 
Victor Malarek - the fifth estate (CBC)
Wendy Mesley - Undercurrents (CBC)

Best Host in a Lifestyle, or Performing Arts Program or Series Peter Jordan - It's a Living - Swimming with Sharks/King for a Day/Song (CBC Manitoba/Life Network)
Marilyn Denis - CityLine (Citytv)
Jeanne Beker - FashionTelevision (CHUM)
Wayne Rostad - On the Road Again (CBC)
Maureen Taylor - Your Health (TVOntario)

Best Sportscaster/AnchorBrian Williams - Pan Am Games (CBC Sports)
Dave Randorf - Pan Am Games (CBC Sports)
Ron MacLean - Hockey Day in Canada - Celebrating the Game (CBC Sports)
Rod Black - NBA on CTV - San Antonio at Toronto (Sportsnet)
Jim Hughson - NHL on CTV Sportsnet, 1999-2000 (Sportsnet)

Best Photography in a Dramatic Program or SeriesMichael Buckley - Dr. Lucille: The Lucille Teasdale Story (TVA International/Motion International/Ballistic Pictures)
Robert Saad - Anne of Green Gables: The Continuing Story (Sullivan Entertainment)
 André Pienaar - Restless Spirits (Accent Entertainment/Temple Street Productions)
Albert J. Dunk - Must Be Santa (CBC)
 
Best Photography in a Comedy, Variety, Performing Arts Program or Series
Marc Charlebois - The Child of Music (Cine Qua Non Films)
 Peter McCallum - Blue Rodeo: The Scenes in Between (Canadian Broadcasting Corporation|CBC)
 Kelly Pykerman - Intimate and Interactive (MuchMusic)
Danny Nowak - Twitch City (Shadow Shows/Accent Entertainment/Canadian Broadcasting Corporation)
Jean Renaud - Voice of a Child: The Foster Parents Plan GalaBest Photography in an Information Program or Series
Stephane Brisson - CTV National News - Clock WatcherGreg Stanton, Chris Triffo - A Soldier’s VoiceRoss MacIntosh - CTV National News - Portrait: Barrie WentzellJohn Griffin - the fifth estate (CBC)
Rick McVicar - The Goods (CBC)

Best Photography in a Documentary Program or Series
Richard Stringer - Exhibit A: Secrets of Forensic Science - Double Jeopardy (Kensington Communications)
Michael Nolan - Frontiers of Construction - Dream Factories (Ragged Earth Productions/Barna-Alper Productions)
Frank Vilaca - Forbidden Places (MapleRock Entertainment)
Keith Brust, Rick Boston - The Secret World of Gardens (Bullfrog Films)
Jim Scott - Warriors of the Night (Nightfighter Productions)

Best Visual Effects
John Gajdecki, David Alexander, Barb Benoit, Jen Vuckovic - Must Be Santa (CBC)
Tony Willis, Alex Boothby - Anne of Green Gables: The Continuing Story (Sullivan Entertainment)
Alwyn Kumst, Ken Whitmore, Noel Hooper, Paul Ackerley - Amazon (Alliance Atlantis
James Tichenor, Michele Comens, Wray J. Douglas, Kent Matheson, Simon Lacey, John Gajdecki - Stargate SG-1 (Stargate SG-1 Productions)
Dug Claxton, Sasha Jarh, Jon Campfens, Wendy Whaley - Total Recall 2070 - Meet My Maker (ONtv/Alliance Atlantis)

Best Picture Editing in a Dramatic Program or Series
Ralph Brunjes - Murder Most Likely (Alliance Atlantis/CTV/Judas Kiss Productions/Two Bridges Entertainment/Telefilm Canada)
Jane Morrison - Da Vinci's Inquest (Haddock Entertainment/Barna-Alper Productions/Alliance Atlantis Productions/Canadian Broadcasting Corporation)
Susan Maggi - One Heart Broken Into Song (Picture Plant/CBC)
Rik Morden - The Artists' Specials - Rembrandt: Fathers & Sons (Devine Entertainment)
Jeff Warren - The Sheldon Kennedy Story (Alberta Filmworks/Sarrazin Couture Entertainment)
 
Best Picture Editing in a Comedy, Variety, Performing Arts Program or Series
Jackie Dzuba - They Live to Polka (NFB) 
Todd Foster, Keith Bradley, Eric Campbell, Gregg Antworth, Allan MacLean - This Hour Has 22 Minutes (Salter Street Films, CBC)
David Murphy, Andrew Kines - tvframesStephen Withrow - Twitch City (Shadow Shows/Accent Entertainment/Canadian Broadcasting Corporation)
Christopher Cooper - The Daily Blade (Jigsaw Productions)
Trevor Ambrose - I Was a Sixth Grade Alien (Winklemania Productions/AAC Kids)

Best Picture Editing in an Information Program or Series
Michèle Hozer - The Nature of Things - Race for the Future II (CBC)
Sarah Lalumiere - On the Road Again (CBC)
Tony Coleman - Undercurrents (CBC)
Steve Thomson - Venture (CBC)
 
Best Picture Editing in a Documentary Program or Series
David Wharnsby - The View from Here - The Holier It Gets (Mercury Films/Requisite Films/TVOntario)
Deborah Palloway - Out of the Fire (Bishari Films)
Brian Williams, Andy Keen - Seven Painters Seven PlacesShelly Hamer - Through a Blue Lens (NFB
Patricia Tassinari - Working Like Crazy (NFB
 
Best Production Design or Art Direction in a Dramatic Program or Series
Richard Hudolin, Mark Davidson, Robert Davidson, Brentan Harron, Bridget McGuire, Douglas McLean, Ivana Vasak - Stargate SG-1 - The Devil You Know (Stargate SG-1 Productions)
 François Lamontagne - Dr. Lucille: The Lucille Teasdale Story (TVA International/Motion International/Ballistic Pictures)
Darlene Lewis, Stephen Osler - One Heart Broken Into Song (Picture Plant/CBC)
Norman Sarazin - The Legend of Sleepy Hollow (Muse Entertainment, Hallmark Entertainment)
David Hackl - Lexx (Salter Street Films/CHUM Television) 

Best Production Design or Art Direction in a Non-Dramatic Program or Series 
Nuala O’Flynn - MuchMusic Video Awards 1999 (MuchMusic)
Stephen Osler - This Hour Has 22 Minutes (Salter Street Films, CBC)
Andrew Murray - Comedy Now! - Uncensored (CTV)
James Hubbard - eNowBest Costume Design 
Ruy Filipe - Dr. Lucille: The Lucille Teasdale Story (TVA International/Motion International/Ballistic Pictures)
Ruth Secord - '''Anne of Green Gables: The Continuing Story (Sullivan Entertainment)
Laurie Drew - La Femme Nikita (Baton Broadcasting/Fireworks Entertainment)
Christina McQuarrie - Stargate SG-1  (Stargate SG-1 Productions)
Lea Carlson - Twitch City (Shadow Shows/Accent Entertainment/Canadian Broadcasting Corporation)

Best Achievement in Makeup 
Pip Ayotte, Marlene Aarons, Jocelyn MacDonald - Amazon - War (Alliance Atlantis
Sherry Baker, Catherine Davies Irvine - I Was a Sixth Grade Alien (Winklemania Productions/AAC Kids)
Lynda McCormack, Jenny Arbour - Murder Most Likely (Alliance Atlantis/CTV/Judas Kiss Productions/Two Bridges Entertainment/Telefilm Canada)
 Christopher Mark Pinhey, Ryan Nicholson, Holland Miller, Fay von Schroeder, Jan Newman - Stargate SG-1  (Stargate SG-1 Productions)
Michelle Pedersen, Devyn Griffith – The New Addams Family (Film Incentive B.C./Fox Family Worldwide/Shavick Entertainment/Saban Entertainment)
Fay von Schroeder, Tibor Farkas, David Dupuis, Steve Johnson, Joe Colwell - The Outer Limits (Alliance Atlantis/Atlantis Films/Showtime Networks/Trilogy Entertainment)

Best Overall Sound in a Dramatic Program or Series 
Allen Ormerod, Daniel Latour, Scott Shepherd - La Femme Nikita (Baton Broadcasting/Fireworks Entertainment)
Richard Penn, Orest Sushko, Lou Solakofski - Restless Spirits (Accent Entertainment, Temple Street Productions)
Alex Salter, Lou Solakofski, Jim Rillie, Orest Sushko - One Heart Broken Into Song (Picture Plant/CBC)
Dan Daniels, Stephan Carrier, Jack Heeren - Amazon (Alliance Atlantis
Orest Sushko, Shane Connelly, Dino Pigat - The Sheldon Kennedy Story (Alberta Filmworks, Sarrazin Couture Entertainment)

Best Sound Editing in a Dramatic Program or Series 
Jane Tattersall, Rick Cadger, David McCallum, Donna Powell - Restless Spirits (Accent Entertainment, Temple Street Productions)
Antoine Morin, Guy Pelletier, Jacques Plante, Viateur Paiement - Dr. Lucille: The Lucille Teasdale Story (TVA International/Motion International/Ballistic Pictures)
Chris Czopnik, Allan Fung, John Douglas Smith, Steve Baine, Tom Bjelic - Earth: Final Conflict (Atlantis Films)
Rick Cadger, Terry Burke, Alastair Gray, Alison Clark - Murder Most Likely (Alliance Atlantis/CTV/Judas Kiss Productions/Two Bridges Entertainment/Telefilm Canada)
Rose Gregoris, Craig Henighan, Steve Baine, Jill Purdy - La Femme Nikita (Baton Broadcasting/Fireworks Entertainment)

Best Sound in a Comedy, Variety, or Performing Arts Program or Series 
Mike Baskerville, Colin Baxter, Dan Daniels, Tim Roberts, David Drainie Taylor - Twitch City - Shinto Death Cults (Shadow Shows/Accent Entertainment/Canadian Broadcasting Corporation)
René Beaudry, Neal Gaudet, Bob Melanson, Kenny MacDonald, P.J. MacNeil - This Hour Has 22 Minutes (Salter Street Films, CBC)
Alan deGraaf, Eric Mattar-Hurlbut, Glenn Barna, Michael Werth, Mike Northcott -Rolie Polie Olie - (Nelvana/Métal Hurlant Productions) 
 Marcel Duperreault, Todd Araki - Weird-Ohs (Decode Entertainment/EM.TV/Mainframe Studios/Testor Corporation
Simon Bowers, Steve Sexton, Peter Campbell - Anne Murray: What a Wonderful World (Eagle Rock Entertainment)

Best Sound in an Information/Documentary Program or Series 
Peter Sawade, Eric Apps, Elma Belo, Alison Clark, Steve Hammond, Dino Pigat - Legacy of Terror: The Bombing of Air India (Bishari Films, TVOntario)
 Hennie Britton, Gael MacLean, Eric Harwood Davies - Jeni LeGon: Living in a Great Big Way (NFB)
 Dwayne Newman, Dante Winkler - Machine Gun: History Down the Barrel of a Gun - The Gun Comes Home Then Goes to War Again (Discovery Channel/High Road Productions)
Rusty Dunn, Ewan Deane, Chris Ove, Hans Fousek - Murder in Normandy (Paperny Entertainment)
Paul Durand, Elma Bello, Eric Apps, Peter Sawade, Dino Pigat, Marina Adam - Out of the Fire (Bishari Films)
Lewis Cohen, Edouard Dumoulin, Jean-Charles Deshaies, Luc Bourgeois - Road Stories for the Flesh Eating Future (Galafilm)

Best Original Music Score for a Program or Mini-series 
Michel Cusson - Dr. Lucille: The Lucille Teasdale Story (TVA International/Motion International/Ballistic Pictures)
Robert Carli - External Affairs (Shaftesbury Films/Alliance Atlantis)
Denis Larochelle - The Legend of Sleepy Hollow (Muse Entertainment, Hallmark Entertainment)
Mark Korven - The Sheldon Kennedy Story (Alberta Filmworks/Sarrazin Couture Entertainment)
Tim McCauley - Trial By Fire (Alberta Filmworks/Canadian Broadcasting Corporation)

Best Original Music Score for a Dramatic Series 
John Van Tongeren - The Outer Limits (Alliance Atlantis/Atlantis Films/Showtime Networks/Trilogy Entertainment)
Daniel Scott, Paul Baraka - Bob Morane (Cactus Animation/Ellipsanime)
Maribeth Solomon, Micky Erbe - Earth: Final Conflict (Atlantis Films)
Jack Semple, Rob Bryanton - Incredible Story Studios (Mind's Eye Entertainment/Vérité Films)
Bob Wiseman - Twitch City (Shadow Shows/Accent Entertainment/CBC)

Best Original Music Score for a Documentary Program or Series 
Terry Frewer - Over Canada (Gary McCartie Productions)
Lance Neveu - Fire and Ice: The Rocket Richard Riot (Barna-Alper Productions/Galafilm)
Glenn Morley - Life and Times - Stephen Leacock- 90th Parallel Productions/CBC)
Brian Wall - Out of the Fire (Bishari Films)
Longo Hai, Ben Johannesen, Geoff Bennett - The Secret World of Gardens (Bullfrog Films)

Special Awards
Gordon Sinclair Award For Broadcast Journalism - Ron Haggart
John Drainie Award - Shelagh Rogers
Earle Grey Award - Air Farce Live (CBC)
Margaret Collier Award - Robert Forsyth
Gemini Award for Outstanding Technical Achievement - SkyCable of Manitoba
Canada Award - Karen King, Jari Osborne - Unwanted Soldiers (NFB
Academy Achievement Award - Pat Ferns
Viewer's Choice Award for Lifestyle Host - Air Farce Live (CBC
Gemini Award for Most Popular Website Competition - Raja Khanna, Matt O'Sullivan, Michael Prini - Savoir Faire Specials (Primevista Television)

References

Gemini Awards
Gemini Awards, 2000
Gemini Awards